Millbrook Reservoir is a 16,000-megalitre artificial water storage reservoir in the Adelaide Hills, South Australia. It was built from 1914 to 1918 during World War I to control water flows in the upper River Torrens and provide gravity-fed water to Adelaide's eastern suburbs.
It is named after the small town of Millbrook, demolished and removed during construction. During the 1970s, the nearby town of Chain of Ponds was also removed to prevent pollution of the reservoir's water.

Millbrook covers  behind a  clay-cored earth dam. It lies on Chain of Ponds creek, a tributary of the River Torrens. Water in the reservoir is piped from a weir near Gumeracha but it is also used to balance storage of River Murray water via the Mannum–Adelaide pipeline. It also captures approximately half of the Torrens' water flow.

John Tippett named the town of Millbrook in the late 19th century after Millbrook in his native Cornwall.

References

Dams completed in 1918
Embankment dams
Earth-filled dams
Dams in South Australia
Reservoirs in South Australia